La noche del pecado ("The Night of Sin") is a 1933 Mexican film. It stars Carlos Orellana.

External links
 

1933 films
1930s Spanish-language films
Mexican black-and-white films
Mexican romantic drama films
1933 romantic drama films
1930s Mexican films